General elections were held in the Gambia on 29 April 1992. The election date was announced on 14 February and the National Assembly was dissolved three days later. Although he had announced his retirement in December 1991, President Dawda Jawara changed his mind and ran for the position again. Both elections were won by the ruling People's Progressive Party (PPP), with Jawara remaining president, winning 58.5% of the vote. Voter turnout was around 55.8%.

Campaign
A total of 130 candidates ran for the 36 elected seats, although the PPP was the only one with a candidate in every seat. The opposition campaign centred on corruption and economic mismanagement, whilst the PPP promised it would boost the tourism industry and support groundnut farmers.

Results

President

National Assembly

References

Gambia
Parliamentary elections in the Gambia
Election
Presidential elections in the Gambia
April 1992 events in Africa
Election and referendum articles with incomplete results